James Armstrong (March 1, 1830, in Queensbury, New Brunswick – January 26, 1893) was a Canadian politician and farmer. He ran in a federal by-election in 1875 in the riding of Middlesex East and lost. He was elected in 1882 as a member of the Liberal Party representing the riding of Middlesex South. He was re-elected in 1887 and 1891. Armstrong died in office at the age of 62.

Biography
He was the son of Thomas Armstrong and Agnes Murray, both immigrants from Roxburghshire, Scotland, and was educated in Middlesex County, Upper Canada. Armstrong was married twice: to Jane Fraser in 1858 and to Annie McCall in 1873. He was president of the London Mutual Fire Insurance Company and a director of the Canadian Saving and Loan Company. He was also a superintendent of schools, township clerk, reeve for Westminster Township and warden for Middlesex County.

References 
 

1830 births
1893 deaths
Liberal Party of Canada MPs
Members of the House of Commons of Canada from Ontario
People from York County, New Brunswick